Åke Hansson (16 April 1903 – 21 October 1981) was a Swedish football defender.

References

1903 births
1981 deaths
Association football defenders
Swedish footballers
Sweden international footballers
IFK Göteborg players
Allsvenskan players
Footballers from Gothenburg